Juan Jorge Giaconi Gandolfo (14 April 1945 – 18 December 2022) was a Chilean doctor and politician. An independent, he served as Minister of Public Health from 1986 to 1990.

Giaconi died on 18 December 2022, at the age of 77.

References

1945 births
2022 deaths
Chilean Ministers of Health
Chilean physicians
Chilean surgeons
University of Chile alumni
Government ministers of Chile
20th-century Chilean physicians
20th-century Chilean politicians
20th-century surgeons